The EOC 4-inch 50 caliber was a British naval gun designed by the Elswick Ordnance Company for export customers in the years before World War I that armed warships of the Republic of China and the Greek Navy.  These ships served in both World War I and later World War II.

History 
The EOC 4-inch 50 caliber began life as a design produced by the parent company of Elswick, Armstrong Whitworth for export customers called the Pattern P.  These guns did not serve aboard ships of the Royal Navy.

Construction 
The EOC 4-inch 50 caliber was constructed of an A tube and wire wound with a protective outer jacket.  It also had a horizontal sliding-wedge breech and fired fixed quick fire ammunition.

Naval use 
EOC 4-inch 50 caliber guns armed coastal defense ships, destroyers and protected cruisers.

Coastal defense ships
  - Two of the four ships of this class Yongjian and Yongji were armed with a single bow mounted EOC 4-inch gun.  While Yongfeng and Yongxiang were similar in configuration they carried a single bow mounted Krupp 10.5 cm SK L/40 gun instead.

Destroyers
  - The four ships of this class had a primary armament of four EOC 4-inch guns.  One was bow mounted, one was amidships and two were at the stern.

Protected cruisers
  - Two ships of this class  and  had a secondary armament of four shielded EOC 4-inch guns on sponsons amidships.  The third ship of the class named  was sold to Greece before completion and had a different armament scheme.

References

Notes 

Naval guns of the United Kingdom
World War I naval weapons
World War II naval weapons
100 mm artillery